The 2015 Claro Open Bucaramanga was a professional tennis tournament played on clay courts. It was the seventh edition of the tournament which was part of the 2015 ATP Challenger Tour. It took place in Bucaramanga, Colombia between 27 January and 1 February 2015.

Singles main draw entrants

Seeds

 1 Rankings are as of January 19, 2015.

Other entrants
The following players received wildcards into the singles main draw:
  Alejandro González
  Kevin Kim
  Pedro Pablo Ruiz
  Eduardo Struvay

The following players received entry from the qualifying draw:
  José Hernández
  Martín Cuevas
  Hugo Dellien
  Guilherme Clezar

Champions

Singles

 Daniel Gimeno Traver def.  Gastão Elias 6–3, 1–6, 7–5

Doubles

 Guillermo Durán /  Andrés Molteni def.  Nicolás Barrientos /  Eduardo Struvay 7–5, 6–7(8–10), [10–0]

External links
Official Website

Claro Open Bucaramanga
Seguros Bolívar Open Bucaramanga
Claro Open Bucaramanga